Elachista anitella is a moth of the family Elachistidae. It is found in Spain, Ukraine and Russia.

References

anitella
Moths described in 1985
Moths of Europe